97 may refer to: 

 97 (number)

Years
 97 BC
 AD 97
 1997
 2097

Other uses
 97%, the figure from a seminal study of scientific consensus on climate change (i.e. 97% of surveyed articles on climate change agreed that humans are causing global warming)
 "'97" (song), from the compilation album Alkaline Trio by Chicago-based punk rock band Alkaline Trio
 Saab 97, an automobile
 British Rail Class 97
 Hot 97, a hip-hop radio station in New York City under the name WQHT
Microsoft Office 97, a version of Microsoft Office.
 Marching 97, the Lehigh University marching band

See also
 
 Berkelium (atomic number), a chemical element
 List of highways numbered 
 Madden NFL 97, a video game